Kalle Parviainen (born 3 October 1982) is a Finnish professional football striker who currently plays for the Veikkausliiga side FC Inter in Finland.

While Parviainen was the leading scorer at his previous club, KuPS, he has played mostly as a defender at FC Haka. Versatile Parviainen played as a midfielder before becoming a striker. On 26 October 2010 he signed a three-year contract with FC Inter.

He made his national team debut on 29 May 2010, in a friendly against Poland.

References
Guardian Football

1982 births
Living people
People from Kuopio
Finnish footballers
Veikkausliiga players
FC Haka players
Association football forwards
Finland international footballers
Sportspeople from North Savo